Myrceugenia correifolia is a species of evergreen woody flowering shrub belonging to the Myrtle family, Myrtaceae. The common name of this plant is petrillo. The species is native to South America; an example occurrence is in central Chile within the La Campana National Park.

See also
 Myrceugenia exsucca

Line notes

References
 C. Michael Hogan. 2008. Chilean Wine Palm: Jubaea chilensis, GlobalTwitcher.com, ed. N. Stromberg
 Ehsan Masood and Daniel Schaffer. 2006. Dry: life without water, 192 pages

correifolia
Flora of southern South America
Flora of Chile